Renzo Garlaschelli (born 29 March 1950) is an Italian former footballer of South American origin who played as a forward. Born in South America, of Italian immigrant parents, Garlaschelli returned to Italy where he joined the football ranks at a very young age winning the League title with S.S. Lazio in 1974.

External links
 Renzo Garlaschelli at Radio Sei

1950 births
Living people
Italian footballers
Serie A players
Serie B players
Serie C players
Serie D players
Como 1907 players
S.S. Lazio players
F.C. Pavia players
Association football forwards